Roger Tessier (born 14 January 1939 in Nantes) is a French composer. With Gérard Grisey, Tristan Murail and Michaël Lévinas, he is one of the founding members of the Parisian Ensemble l'Itinéraire. From 1962 to 1965, Tessier studied musical composition at the Conservatoire de Paris.

Selected works 
 1962: Automne, choir for 4 mixed voices
 1971: Mouvements II, for piano
 1975: Danses pour Annaig, for oboe, harp and string orchestra
 1976: Ojma, for string trio, commissioned by Radio France
 1979: Clair-Obscur, for soprano, flute, horn, cello and electroacoustics
 1987: Coalescene, for clarinet and 2 orchestras
 1988: Scène III, for cello and tape
 1992: Scène IV, for 2 horns after texts by Emil Cioran
 1992: L'ombre de Narcisse, for 11 instruments
 1994: Electric Dream Fantasy for trio Ondes Martenot
 1998: Envol. A la mémoire de Nicolas de Stael, for Octet

Bibliography 
 Jean-Noel von der Weid: Die Musik des 20. Jahrhunderts. Frankfurt am Main & Leipzig 2001, p. 541.

References

External links 
 "Roger Tessier", Centre de documentation de la musique contemporaine (Cdmc)
 "Le Bel itinéraire de Roger Tessier", France Musique, 7 June 2017
 

French composers
20th-century classical composers
Conservatoire de Paris alumni
Musicians from Nantes
1939 births
Living people
20th-century French composers